Archduke Joseph Ferdinand of Austria (24 May 1872 – 28 August 1942) was an Austro-Hungarian Archduke, military commander, from 1916 Generaloberst, and early advocate of air power. He later retired to life as a common citizen of Austria, and was briefly imprisoned in Dachau during the Nazi era.

Early life
Joseph Ferdinand was born in Salzburg to Ferdinand IV, Grand Duke of Tuscany, the last Grand Duke of Tuscany, and his wife, Alice of Bourbon-Parma. As the fourth child and second son, he assumed the mantle of heir after his elder brother gave up the claim following numerous scandals. While his father had kept the title of Grand Duke of Tuscany after the abolition of the Dukedom in 1866, he had abdicated it in favor of the Austrian Emperor in 1870. Joseph Ferdinand did not pretend to the title of Grand Duke himself.

Education and career
Joseph Ferdinand attended the military Oberrealschule at Hranice (in that time also known as Mährisch Weissenkirchen) and later the Maria Theresa Military Academy at Wiener Neustadt. Upon graduating from the academy, he was commissioned as a lieutenant in the Tirol Jäger regiment on  18 August 1892. Following various assignments with Infantrie Regiment (IR) No's. 93, 17, 59 and the Tirol Jäger Regiment No. 4, he was attached to IR No. 27 as an Oberstleutnant in 1903. From 1895 until 1897, he attended the Kriegsschule in Vienna. From 1905 until 1908, the Archduke commanded IR No. 93 as an Oberst, then the Infantry Brigade No. 5.

The Archduke Joseph Ferdinand concerned himself with aviation, which was not taken seriously in military circles at the time. He was fascinated by balloons from an early age; in 1909, he arranged a balloon flight from his manor in Linz to Dieppe in France, which lasted 16 hours. In January 1911, the Archduke received command of the 3rd infantry division in Linz, followed afterwards by his promotion to Feldmarschalleutnant on  1 May 1911.

World War I
In August 1914, he took the command of the XIV Corps, succeeding General der Kavallerie Viktor Dankl von Krasnik, who had taken command of the First Army. His Corps was part of the Third Army of General Brudermann. In early September 1914, the devastating battles at the Zlota and Gnila Lipas practically destroyed the Third Army, and the Fourth Army under General Auffenberg was also decimated following Rawa Russka. The Archduke was chosen to replace Auffenberg on October 1. Meanwhile, the XIV Corps was taken over by Feldmarschalleutnant Josef Roth on 30 September.

Joseph Ferdinand was to remain in command of the Fourth Army until early June 1916. At this time, General Aleksei Brusilov launched the Brusilov Offensive at the juncture of the Fourth and First Armies. The result was that Joseph Ferdinand's trenches were obliterated by the Russian bombardment and his troops surrendered en masse to the advancing Russians. In light of this massive set-back, the German High Command insisted on his removal from command. The Archduke went into retirement and was replaced by General Tersztyanszky.

Following the accession of Kaiser Karl in November 1916, Archduke Joseph Ferdinand was offered the post of Inspector General of the Imperial Air Force. The Archduke brought his interest in ballooning to the post, although the Army HQ immediately objected to the appointment. In spite of their reservations, the Archduke was appointed on  8 July 1917 and he remained there until  3 September 1918.

Theodore von Kármán, then an Oberleutnant in the Austro-Hungarian Luftarsenal, found Joseph Ferdinand to be an "ignorant and pompous fellow."  As Inspector General Joseph Ferdinand visited the Austro-Daimler Company where he was shown the company's first six-cylinder airplane engine by Ferdinand Porsche. In his autobiography von Kármán relates an exchange between Joseph Ferdinand and Porsche:
  "Is this a four cylinder engine?" the Archduke asked.
  "Yes, Imperial Highness."
  "Well, then why are there six cylinders?" he demanded.
  Porsche with a side wink at me replied: "The last two cylinders are reserves."

Marriages and issue
He was married at Maria Plain on 2 May 1921 to Rosa Kaltenbrunner (Linz, 27 February 1878 – Salzburg, 9 December 1929), who was not a noble; the marriage lasted until their divorce in 1928, without issue. 

In Vienna on 27 January 1929, Joseph Ferdinand married again, this time to Gertrude Tomanek, Edle von Beyerfels-Mondsee (Brünn, 13 April 1902 – Salzburg, 15 February 1997). He had two children from this marriage; 
 Claudia Maria Theresia von Habsburg-Lothringen, born in Vienna on 6 April 1930, unmarried and without issue, 
 Maximilian Franz Joseph Karl Otto Heinrich von Habsburg-Lothringen, born in Vienna on 17 March 1932 and married in London on 3 September 1961 to Doris Williams, born in Blundell Sands, Lancashire, on 24 December 1929, by whom he had an only daughter, Maria Camilla von Habsburg-Lothringen, born in Wimbledon on 29 May 1962, unmarried and without issue.

Imprisonment and release
When the Germans occupied Austria in 1938, Joseph Ferdinand was arrested along with more than 70,000 other Viennese. He was interrogated by the Gestapo and sent to Dachau concentration camp, where he was imprisoned for three months. The conditions in the camp ruined his health permanently. Joseph Ferdinand was released by the petition of Albert and Olga Göring and lived an isolated existence thereafter, under continual observation by the Gestapo. After his release, he settled in Vienna as a commoner. He died on 28 August 1942 in Vienna.

Ancestry

References 
 The Austro-Hungarian army

|-

|-

|-

1872 births
1942 deaths
Military personnel from Salzburg
Field marshals of Austria
Austro-Hungarian military personnel of World War I
House of Habsburg-Lorraine
Austro-Hungarian Army officers
Austro-Hungarian Air Service personnel
Military aviation leaders of World War I
Austrian princes
Grand Masters of the Order of Saint Joseph
Knights of the Golden Fleece of Austria
Theresian Military Academy alumni
Burials at the Imperial Crypt
Sons of monarchs